Rassvet is a rural locality (a settlement) in Medvedevskoye Rural Settlement, Ilovlinsky District, Volgograd Oblast, Russia. The population was 65 as of 2010.

Geography 
Rassvet is located 48 km east of Ilovlya (the district's administrative centre) by road. Medvedev is the nearest rural locality.

References 

Rural localities in Ilovlinsky District